André Cordeiro may refer to:

 André Cordeiro (water polo) (born 1967), water polo goalkeeper from Brazil
 André Cordeiro (swimmer) (born 1974), retired freestyle swimmer from Brazil